Birgitta Linderoth Wallace (born 1944) is a Swedish–Canadian archaeologist specialising in Norse archaeology in North America. She spent most of her career as an archaeologist with Parks Canada and is best known for her work on L'Anse aux Meadows, currently the only widely accepted Norse site in North America.

She received a Smith-Wintemberg Award from the Canadian Archaeological Association in 2015.

Education and career 
Wallace was born in Sweden to Swedish and Danish parents. She studied at Uppsala University and trained on archaeological sites in Sweden and Norway. After receiving her master's degree, she spent some time as a curator at the Carnegie Museum of Natural History in Pittsburgh, Pennsylvania. In 1975, she moved to Canada to take a position as an archaeologist with Parks Canada, where she remained until her retirement.

The focus of Wallace's career has been Norse archaeology in North America, which she began working on at the Carnegie Museum. However, she has also worked on Native American, Aboriginal Canadian, and early French Canadian sites in North America, as well as in Scandinavia and Israel.

Selected publications

References 

1944 births
Living people
Swedish archaeologists
Canadian archaeologists
Swedish women archaeologists
Canadian women archaeologists
Uppsala University alumni
20th-century archaeologists
21st-century archaeologists
21st-century Swedish women writers
20th-century Swedish women writers
20th-century Canadian women writers
21st-century Canadian women writers